Coolatai is a town in the New England region of northern New South Wales, Australia. At the 2006 census, Coolatai and the surrounding area had a population of 179.

Coolatai Post Office opened on 15 February 1898 and closed around 1980.

References

Towns in New South Wales
Towns in New England (New South Wales)
Gwydir Shire